A charter township is a form of local government in the U.S. state of Michigan. Townships in Michigan are organized governments.  A charter township has been granted a charter, which allows it certain rights and responsibilities of home rule that are generally intermediate between those of a city (a semi-autonomous jurisdiction in Michigan) and a village. Unless it is a home-rule village, a village is subject to the authority of any township in which it is located.

History
Following World War II, suburbanization increased the population in many formerly outlying communities. In 1947, the state legislature created a special charter township status, which grants additional powers and streamlined administration in order to provide greater protection for townships against annexation of land by cities and villages. , there were 118 charter townships in Michigan (Alpena Township was chartered on February 26, 2018). A township with a population of 2,000 or more may incorporate as a charter township and become a municipal corporation. It possesses all the powers of a non-charter township, in addition to those specified by the Charter Township Act of 1947.

Government
Legislative authority is exercised by an elected township board of seven members, consisting of the supervisor, township clerk, township treasurer, and four trustees. They must be residents of the township and eligible to vote in elections. All members of the board serve four-year terms. Unlike the boards for general law townships, which may have either five or seven members, a charter township must have seven members. If a general law township with a five-member board elects to become a charter township, two additional members are to be elected in the next general election.

Charter townships may appoint either a township superintendent or township manager, who can be assigned responsibilities for managing township functions. (This is comparable to cities that hire a city manager to oversee the day-to-day operations of the city). Otherwise, executive authority lies with the supervisor and various committees.

Privileges
A charter township may establish a variety of municipal services, such as a police force, fire department, and assessors, and may also acquire property. It may borrow money and issue bonds, with the approval of a majority of township voters in an election. Similarly, a charter township cannot levy taxes without the approval of a majority of the township population voting in an election. This is one significant difference from home-rule municipalities, in which the municipal authority can levy taxes without specific approval from voters.

Requirements
A charter township is mostly exempt from annexation from contiguous cities or villages, providing that the township meets certain requirements:
Has state equalized valuation of at least $25,000,000
Has a minimum population density of 150 people per square mile (58/km2)
Provides fire protection service by contract or otherwise
Is governed by a comprehensive zoning ordinance or master plan
Provides solid waste disposal services to township residents, within or without the township, by contract, license, or municipal ownership
Provides water or sewer services, or both, by contract or otherwise
Provides police protection through contract with the sheriff in addition to normal sheriff patrol, through an intergovernmental contract, or through its own police department

Annexation and 425 Agreements

A charter township may still be subject to annexation under certain conditions, such as for the purpose of eliminating isolated islands of township or by vote of a majority of the residents of a portion of township. Temporary land transfers, which can involve charter townships, have provision under Public Act 425 of 1984. Under this statute, a charter township, for example, can have land transferred to a city in exchange for revenue sharing of the transferred parcels. These agreements, known as 425 Agreements, can last up to 50 years, and the land can either be completely transferred to the city or returned to the township upon fulfillment of the agreement.

See also
 Coterminous municipality
 Paper township

Notes

External links
The Charter Township Act of 1947
Michigan Township Association

 
Local government in Michigan
Townships in the United States